JC Denton is the player character and protagonist of the first-person role-playing video game Deus Ex and a supporting character in its sequel, Deus Ex: Invisible War. He is voiced by Jay Anthony Franke in both games. Denton was created by Deus Ex director Warren Spector. In his twenties, Denton begins the first Deus Ex as a new graduate of UNATCO, and a prized nano-augmented agent. JC is initially dedicated to his duties but is influenced by his brother, fellow nano-augmented UNATCO agent Paul Denton. The character was intentionally designed as a blank slate, one which the player could roleplay and immerse themselves in. This characteristic led to criticism by reviewers, singling out his monotone and lack of prominent personality flaws. Despite this, JC Denton remains a popular and iconic video game character.

Concept and design
JC was designed as a blank slate, in accordance with the roleplaying elements of Deus Ex. The creators sought to maximize immersion in the game and player freedom. Warren Spector reported taking this "maybe too far" and developers directed Denton's voice actor "no emotion in your voice, no inflection, nothing". Spector continued: "That's how far we were willing to go to ensure that the players inhabited the body of the character."

JC's deadpan-voice and sarcasm was an influence for Adam Jensen, protagonist of the prequel series.

"JC Denton" is said to be a codename, and the player can create JC's true name and pick from a variety of preset appearances. In addition, JC's skill-set and augmentations may be customized, defining JC's characteristics. JC's personality and morality may be defined by the player, through actions and dialogue choices. JC Denton's voice actor, Jay Anthony Franke, was a quality-assurance tester at Ion Storm Studios, and did work on a previous game of the studio, Daikatana. This led to him being hired for the role of Denton. Franke was also a tester on Deus Ex, his lines not added until the end of production. 

Denton is the clone of Paul Denton (also voiced by Franke), the first nano-augmented agent in the Deus Ex universe, though ostensibly not the first nano-augmented person. The two came from a family in poverty, until Paul was noticed by members of Majestic-12. In exchange for money, Paul's mother carries a clone of him, and eventually gives birth to JC. The two are shepherded by Majestic-12, with their parents murdered and JC put into a Majestic-12 run school.

Paul has been noted by critics to be an anchor for JC, as a non-controllable character whose motivation and actions are not decided by the player. Kirk Hamilton in Kotaku writes "J.C. Denton, by way of our actions, became a hero or a monster, and that transformation was largely reflected through the lens of his brother Paul."

Appearances

Deus Ex
In the original, Denton begins as a newly graduated nano-augmented agent of UNATCO (United Nations Anti-Terrorist Coalition), fighting the secessionist NSF in New York. However, he learns that he is a pawn of a global conspiracy led by the organisation Majestic-12, and so defects with Paul. The ending of the game allows him to side with the Illuminati to bring about a benevolent conspiracy over the world, destroy the internet and bring about a decentralized dark age over the world, or merge with the artificial intelligence Helios in order to govern the world.

Deus Ex: Invisible War
In the second game, JC is no longer the player character. Invisible War takes place after events that mix elements from multiple of Deus Exs endings. Denton brings about the collapse of globalized civilization but merges with Helios; however, this merger becomes problematic, almost killing him and forcing him into cryogenic stasis. His two lieutenants, Paul and scientist Tracer Tong, both seek to bring about his plans while he is in stasis, by forming the organisation ApostleCorp. ApostleCorp trains JC's clone and second sibling, Alex Denton. The transhumanist agenda of ApostleCorp brings it into conflict with other factions in Invisible War. Alex awakens JC from stasis, and has the choice of aiding him in his plans to unite humanity in a post-human society or opposing him. If JC is sided with, Helios succeeds in creating a singularity-level society.

Characteristics
While the meaning of his initials is never revealed in the games, they were revealed by Warren Spector in 2017 to stand for "Jesus Christ", as fans had speculated since the game's release. Denton's full name was based on a friendly exclamation Spector often used, "Jesus Christ, Denton", referring to his friend, the writer Bradley Denton. This exclamation can be heard in the game shouted by Walton Simons if the player chooses to kill the prisoners while he interrogates them downstairs at UNATCO headquarters. The developers were planning to go further and make Denton a descendant of Jesus Christ, but this was never used in the game.

Reception
In 2012, GamesRadar ranked him as the 36th "most memorable, influential, and badass" protagonist in games, commenting: "like some sort of futuristic Sherlock Holmes, he’s intelligent, incredibly resourceful, and just enough of a loner to ensure that he won’t let anything get in the way of his objective. [...] While it’s ultimately up to you where JC’s loyalties reside, one thing’s for sure: This guy’s always up to the task, no matter how dangerous it might be." GameSpy's Mike Sharkey called JC Denton a noticeable omission from the 2011 Guinness World Records Gamer's Editions top 50 video game characters.

Rock, Paper, Shotguns Alec Meer criticized JC Denton, calling him the "blankest of blank characters", but stated he was still better than later protagonist Adam Jensen due to the supporting characters surrounding him such as Paul Denton.

Kotakus Kirk Hamilton writes that "We never get much of a sense of Denton's motivation, and why would we, really? We are his motivation. He moves into action because one of us pressed the "W" key."

References

External links

Clone characters in video games
Cyborg characters in video games
Fictional American people in video games
Fictional secret agents and spies in video games
Fictional United Nations personnel
Hackers in video games
Male characters in video games
Square Enix protagonists
Video game characters introduced in 2000
Deus Ex
Merged fictional characters